The 2018 San Bernardino mayoral election was held on June 5, 2018, and November 6, 2018, to elect the mayor of San Bernardino, California. It saw the election of John Valdivia, who defeated incumbent mayor R. Carey Davis.

Municipal elections in California are officially non-partisan.

Results

First round

Runoff results

References 

San Bernardino
Mayoral elections in San Bernardino, California
San Bernardino